The Lancashire Coalfield was one of the most prolific in England. The number of shafts sunk to gain coal number several thousand, for example, in 1958, Wigan undertook a survey of old shafts and located 500. 
In 1995 following several years of redevelopment across the Wigan Metropolitan Borough by the British Geological Survey (BGS), in association with the planning consultants Roger Tym & Partners, the list had grown to over 1000 with no real idea of the total. Similar surveys in Bolton and Manchester have also produced long lists of undocumented shafts.

The proliferation of mines resulted from its accessibility at the start of the Industrial Revolution and the climate which was ideal for cotton mills. Coal fed the boilers of the cotton mill towns of Ashton-under-Lyne, Blackburn, Bolton, Burnley, Bury, Darwen, Oldham and Rochdale as well as the Rossendale Valley. The first industrial revolution coal mines supplied coal locally and to Liverpool, along the River Mersey via the Sankey Canal. On the Manchester Coalfield, the early collieries were those of the Duke of Bridgewater in Worsley, where the Bridgewater Canal was built to transport coal from his mines to Manchester.
 
Lancashire miners used terms in different ways to other coal mining areas. A mine in Lancashire refers to a coal seam, so the Doe mine refers to the Doe seam. The term pit was used for the shaft sunk to the access the mine and the term colliery was used to describe the whole of the surface area including the headgear, wash-houses, offices, trams etc.  An example is:
Garswood Hall Colliery consisting of three pits: the number 9, the number 2 and the number 3 working the Ravin, Orrell Four Foot and Arley mines.

In 1880, the Mines Inspector reported 534 coal pits in the Lancashire field. In 1947 when the industry was nationalised, there were 108 collieries Parkside Colliery in Newton le Willows was the last pit to be sunk in Lancashire, production started in 1960 and was the last to close in 1993.

The list has been compiled from the official reports of the Mines Inspector and lists of mines produced by National Coal Board and the Coal Authority.

The list gives the name of the pit which by convention did not usually use the word pit after it followed by the location and date of closure if known, e.g. Chadderton, Chadderton is the Chadderton Pit located in Chadderton.

Bolton area

Blackrod
Anderton Hall,
Arley,
Blackrod, later became No. 1) Blackrod No 2, Blackrod No 4
Bull Ring,
Dark Lane,
King Coal,
Marklands,
Park Hall,
Scott Lane,
Victoria Main,

Bolton
Breightmet, Breightmet
Brinsop, Lostock
Burnden, Bolton
Cheetham Close, Bolton
Doffcocker, Halliwell,
Gibraltar, Lostock
Higher Croft, Breightmet
Little, Bolton
Parsonage, Bolton
Quarlton, Quarlton
Rose Hill,*Burnden
Smithills, Halliwell
Tonge, Tonge/Bolton
Tonge Fold, Bolton
Tonge Moor, Bolton
Turton Moor, Turton - shown disused 1908
Victoria, Rumworth
Walker Fold, Bolton
Westhoughton New, Lostock

Farnworth and Kearsley
Clammerclough, Farnworth
Doe, Kearsley
Farnworth, Farnworth
Kearsley, Farnworth
Kearsley Moss, Kearsley
Little Hey, Kearsley
Little Hey Pumping, Kearsley
Lords Moss, Farnworth
Manor, Kearsley
Machine, Farnworth
Nob End Bell Pits, Kearsley
Lords Moss Field, Farnworth
Scowcrofts, Kearsley
Spindle Point, Kearsley
Stoneclough, Kearsley
Stonehill,*Farnworth
Tonges Field, Farnworth
Unity Brook, Kearsley

Harwood
Great Harwood, Great Harwood
Harwood, Harwood
Hill End, Harwood

Horwich and Rivington
Montcliffe, Horwich
New Fields, Horwich
Rivington Moor, Rivington
Willows, Horwich
Wildersmoor, Horwich  (mainly fireclay)
Winter Hill, Horwich - shown abandoned 1908

Middle and Over Hulton
Bank House, Middle Hulton
Chequerbent Arley,*Over Hulton
Chequerbent Yard, Over Hulton
Chequerbent Three Quarters, Over Hulton
Deep Halt Yard, Over Hulton
Three Quarter, Over Hulton
Yard, Over Hulton

Darcy, Great and Little Lever

Croft Side and Victoria, Darcy Lever
Darcy Lever, Darcy lever
Davenport, Darcy Lever
Foggs, Darcey Lever
Hacken, Darcy Lever
Snow Hill, Darcy Lever
Top o' th' Lane, Darcy Lever
Victoria, Darcy Lever
Five Quarter, Great Lever, Bolton
Gravel Hole, Great Lever
Great Lever, Great lever
Lever Bridge, Great Lever
Raikes, Great Lever
Bally, Little Lever
Bents, Little Lever
Dingle, Little Lever
Farnworth Bridge, Little Lever
Farnworth Bottom, Little Lever
Harpurfold, Little Lever
Ladyshore, Little Lever
Back o'th Barn, Little Lever - (later renamed Ladyshore)
Little, Little Lever
Middle Bents, Little Lever
New Rivin, Little Lever
Owl Hole, Little Lever
Victoria, Little Lever
Riven, Little Lever
Stopes, Little Lever

Westhoughton
Albert
Brinsop Hall
Brinsop Hall Arley
Brinsop Yard
Brookside
Bugle Horn
Cow Lee Lane
Eatock No 1 & 2
Hewlet
Hilton House
Hulton (also known as the Pretoria Pit) - closed 1934
Lostock Lane
Pretoria (also known as Hulton Colliery) - closed 1934
Snydale Hall
Starkie
Westhoughton Nos 4, 6 & 7 - Nos 6 & 7 shown abandoned 1908

Bury, Bacup and Radcliffe

Bacup
Bank Top
Blackclough Arley
Blue Ball, Brandwood
Broadclough
Brook Side
Clough Head, Sharneyford - listed as abandoned 1938
Clough Head Clay, Sharneyford
Deansgreave
Deerplay
Dinely
Freeholds
Greave, Brandwood
Green's Moor, Brandwood
Hogshead, Whitworth
Hill Top, Sharneyford, 1948-1966 and 1997-2014
Hoyle Hey, Brandwood
Inchfield Moor
Lee Moor
Lower Mountain
Meadows
New Line
Old Clough
Old Meadows (Newchurch in list)
Old Sink, Rooley Moor
Parrocks
Rooley Moor, Rooley Moor
Sheephouse Clough

Birtle
Birtle
Birtle Dean
Bowling Green
Openshaw
Smethurst Hall
Thorney Hurst

Bury
Affeside, Tottington
Ainsworth, Red House Ainsworth
Clough Side, Prestwich
Cob House, Birtle
Dark Lane, Walmsbury
Elton, Elton
Fern Hill, Bury
Higher Hill, Shuttleworth
Hunger Hill, Rooly Moor
Lumb, Birtle
New Hey, Brandwood
Oaken Clough, Brandwood
Old Hey, Brandwood
Pilsworth, Pilsworth
Railway, Ainsworth
Sand Rock, Walmersley
Scout Moor, Shuttleworth
Shipper Bottom, Walmersley
Snape Hill, Walmersley
Tooter Hill, Brandwood
Woodgate Hill

Radcliffe
Allens Green (with Green Lane)
Bank Top
Black Moss
Canal Side
Cockey Moor
Coney Green
Green Lane
Hampson Meadow
Hay Side
Holcombe, Holcombe Hill
Openshaw Fold
Outwood No 2, Outwood
Outwood No 4, Outwood
Radcliffe Bridge
Ringley, Outwood - shown disused 1908
Stand Lane
Whitaker Bridge
Withins Lane
Wolstenholdfold

Leigh area

Astley

Astley Green Colliery -Sinking 1908, Closed 1970
Cross Hillock opened after 1866, closed 1887
Gin Pit Colliery
Nook Colliery Nook Nos 2, 3 and 4, had four shafts.

Atherton
Atherton
Chanters Colliery, Hindsford - Closed 1966 Chanters No 2 Closed 1966
Crumbuke, Howe Bridge - Closed 1907
Fan
Gibfield Colliery Arley - Closed 1963
Howe Bridge Colliery - Closed 1959
Lovers Lane - Closed 1898
Victoria

Hindley
Albion
Amberswood
Deep
Hindley Green
Hindley Hall
Ladies Lane Nos 1, 2 and 4
Low Hall
Stangeways Hall

Leigh and Golborne

Bedford Colliery, Bedford, sinking 1874, Bedford No 3. closed 1967
Edge Green, Golborne
Golborne Golborne Nos 1 and 2, Golborne
Hindley Field, Golborne
Lilly Lane, Golborne
Bank Field, Westleigh
Bickershaw Colliery No 1, Leigh - Closed 1992 Bickershaw had multiple shafts: Nos 2, 3 and 4, No 5, Also known as Plank Lane - Closed 1992
Broadfield, Westleigh
Hearts o' th' meadow, Westleigh
Heyfield, Westleigh
Lower Hall Nos. 1 & 2 Westleigh
Park, Westleigh
Parsonage Colliery No 1 Parsonage No 2
Pickley Heys, Westleigh
Priestners Nos 1 & 2, Westleigh
Snapes, Westleigh
Springfield, Westleigh
Westleigh
Westleigh Lane

Tyldesley
Cleworth Hall Colliery Nos 1, 2 and 3 sunk 1874
Combermere Colliery - opened 1878, closed 1893 shown disused 1908
Ellenbrook
Fan
Gatley, New Manchester
Great Boys Colliery
Messhing Trees Renamed Wellington Pit, Shakerley
Nelson
New Lester No 1 & No 2
Peel
Peelwood Colliery
Shakerley - listed as abandoned 1938
St George's Colliery Nos 2 and 3
Tyldesley
Wharton Hall No 1, Nos 2 & 3
Yew Tree Colliery

Manchester and Salford

Ashton-under-Lyne and Stalybridge
Ashton Moss, Ashton-under-Lyne (known locally as Snipe) - Closed 1959
Broad Oak, Ashton-under-Lyne
Charlestown, Ashton-under-Lyne
Hartshead, Ashton-under-Lyne
Heys, Ashton-under-Lyne
Higher Mill, Stalybridge
Hurst Knowl, Ashton-under-Lyne
Limehurst, Ashton-under-Lyne
Lords Field, Ashton-under-Lyne
Snipe, Ashton-under-Lyne (properly named Ashton Moss) - Closed 1959

Little Hulton
Arley Deep, Over Hulton
Ashton's Field, Little Hulton
Ashton's Field Pumping Station, Little Hulton
Bank, Little Hulton
Barracks, Little Hulton
Brackley 1 & 2, Middle Hulton
Brackley Day eye, Middle Hulton
Charlton 1 & 2, Little Hulton
Delph, Middle Hulton
Hanging Bank, Little Hulton
Little, Little Hulton
Peel Hall Nos 1,2 & 3, Little Hulton
Smithfold, Little Hulton
Streetgate, Little Hulton
Watergate, Middle Hulton

Manchester
Bradford Colliery, Bradford, Manchester - Closed 1968
Bradford Fireclay, Bradford, Manchester - Closed 1968
Burton Nook, Denton
Broomstair, Denton
Clayton, Clayton
Denton, Denton - flooded during the 1926 miners strike, never reopened, closed 1939/40
Great Wood, Denton
Moston, Newton Heath
Oak Victoria, Audenshaw
Top Pit, Denton
Victoria, Denton

Pendlebury, Clifton and Pendleton
Agecroft Colliery, Pendlebury  (later became 1 & 2) 3 & 4, Pendlebury Closed 1991
Botany Bay, Clifton
Clifton, Clifton
Clifton Hall, Clifton  Closed 1929
Clifton Moss, Clifton 
Kearsley, Clifton, Salford
Moorside, Moorside
New Town Nos 1, 2 and 3 Clifton
Pendlebury Colliery, Pendlebury
Pendleton Colliery Nos 1 & 2, Pendleton
Robin Hood, Clifton
Springwell, Clifton
Timber Yard, Clifton
Wet Earth, Clifton - Closed 1928
Wet Earth Drift, Clifton - Closed 1928

Worsley
Bridgewater 1, 2, 3 & 4 Worsley Renamed Sandhole Colliery Nos 1, 2, 3, & 4, Worlsey
Worsley Navigable Levels, Worsley
Edge Fold, Worsley
Ellesmere, Worsley Ellesmere Nos 1, 2 and 3
Linnyshaw Colliery 1 & 2, Worsley
Mangnalls, Worsley
Mesne Lea, Worsley
New Watergate, Little Hulton
Sanderson, Worsley
Wardley Coppice Field, Wardley
Worsley, Worsley

Burnley area

Altham, Altham
Altham Moorfields, Altham
Aspen, Oswaldtwistle
Baitings, Wolstenholme
Bamford Closes, Wolstenholme
Bank Hall, Burnley -  Closed 1971
Bank Moor, Oswaldtwistle
Barclay Hills, Burnley
Barrowshaw, Barrowshaw
Baxenden, Baxenden
Bee Hole, Burnley
Bell Isle, Tinnicliffe
Belthorn, Yate - shown disused 1908
Birkacre, Birkarce
Blackburn, Whitebirk
Bog Farm, Darwen
Brandlewood Moor, Stacksteads
Brassey Mine, Dulesgate
Brex, Newchurch, Rossendale
Broadfield, Accrington
Broadoak & Tagclough, Accrington
Brookside, Accrington
Broad Oak Nook, Hurst
Bunkers Hill, Stacksteads
Burnley Drift, Burnley
Burnt Hills, Clowbridge
Calder, Altham
Carr & Cleggs, Portsmouth
Chapel, Green
Charnock, Charnock
Cheesden, Lumb
Chorley, Chorley
Clayton, Clayton-le-Moors
Clifton, Burnley -  Closed 1955
Cliviger, Cliviger
Clough Head, Todmorden
Coney, Over Darwen
Copy, Cliviger
Coppy Clough and Park, Church
Cornfield, Padiham
Cranberry Moss, Darwen
Cupola, Clowbridge
Count Hill, Higher Barrowshaw
Dean, Newchurch in Rossendale
Deanwood Clay, Portsmouth
Dearnley, Smallbridge
Dewhurst, Baxendale
Dodbottom, Cliviger
Dogshaw, Over Darwen
Duckworth Hall, Oswaldtwistle
Dunkenhalgh Park, Church
Duxbury Park, Chorley
Eccleshill, Darwin
Ellison Fold, Over Darwen
Elpit Edge, Butterfield
Flash, Eccleshill
Fordoe, Wolstenholme
Foulclough, Todmorden
Freeholds, Whitworth Haigh
Fulledge, Burnley
Gambleside, Crawshaw Booth
Gannow, Habergham
Goodshaw Hill, Rawtenstall
Great Harwood, Accrington
Green Clough Merril Head Farm, Cliviger
Grime Bridge, Lumb in Rossendale (CURRENT)
Grime Bridge, Newchurch
Grime Bridge No 2, Newchurch
Gristlehurst, Heywood
Farnworth House, Duxbury
Habergham, Habergham, Burnley
Hades Farm, Wardle
Handle Hall, Calderbrook
Hapton, Hapton
Hapton Valley, Hapton - Closed 1981
Hauch Hey, Butterworth
Heapy, Heapy Chorley
Helm Clough, Stacksteads
Heskin Hall, Heskin
Hewlett No 1, West Loughton
Hewlett No 2, West Loughton
Hoddlesden, Hoddlesden - listed abandoned 1938
Hoddlesden No 12, Hoddlesden
Holland Moor and No 2, Burnley
Hole House, Cliviger
Hole in Bank, Baxendale
Horse Pasture, Towneley Side, Burnley
Houghton Barn, Altham
Hugh Mill, Waterfoot
Huncoal, Huncoat
Hurstwood, Cliviger
Knotts, Hapton
Laund, Baxendale
Knowl, Wolstenholme
Lancashire & Yorkshire, Thorne Lees
Laund, Baxendale
Lee, Brandwood Moor
Livsey, Blackburn
Lostock Valley, Chorley
Lower Barn, Over Darwen
Lower Darwin, Lower Darwin
Lower East Knowle, Wolstenholme
Meadow Head, Wolstenholme
Midgelden Pastures, Dulesgate
Martholme, Great Harwood
Miller Fold, Accrington
Nabb, Dean nr Newchurch
Padiham, Padiham
Part Banks, Waterfoot
Paulden, Barrowshaw
Pemberton House, Charnock Richard
Portsmouth, Cliviger
Princess, Eccleshill
Railway, Cliviger
Railway, Baxendale
Rawlinson Bridge, Heath Charnock
Red Walls Oswaldtwistle
Reedley, Burnley
Rishton, Rishton
Rowley, Burnley
Scaitliffe, Accrington
Simonstone, Burnley
Smear Hall, Ray with Botton
Stacksteads, Stacksteads
Stacksteads Top, Stacksteads
Stonehill, Oswaldtwistle
Swinshaw, Crawshaw Booth
Taylors Green, Darwin (mainly fireclay)
Tithebarn, Over Darwin
Todmorden Moor, Dulesgate
Towneley Arley, Burnley
Towneley Demesne, Towneley
Towneley Drift, Towneley
Trawden, Trawden
Marsden, Marsden, Burnley Closed 1873
Marsh House, Over Darwen
Martholme, Great Harwood
Meadow Head, Wolstenholme - shown as abandoned 1908
Miller Fold, Accrington
Moorfields, Altham
Moor Road,*Chorley
Moorside, Altham
Nabb, Dean nr Newchurch
New Altham, Altham
Nook, Oswaldtwistle
Old Clough, Newchurch
Old Lyons,*Darwin - shown disused 1908
Padiham, Padiham
Pole Over, Darwen
Pole Lane, Sough
Preistbooth, Dulesgate
Ranglet, Chorley
Red Earth Drift, Yate
Red Lumb, Wolstenholme
Red Walls, Oswaltwistle
Reedley, Burnley
Rishton Heights, Over Darwen
Riston, Riston
Rowley, Westhorne
Saunder Clough, Dulesgate
Scaitcliffe, Accrington
Scholes Fold, Over Darwen
Simonstone, Burnley
Smear Hall, Wray nr Lancaster
South Grain, Todmorden
Stacksteads, Stacksteads
Stacksteads Top, Stacksteads
Stanhill,*Oswaldtwistle
Swinshaw, Crawshaw Booth
Taylors Green, Darwin
Thornlee, Thornlee - shown disused 1908
Thorny Bank, Burnley - Closed 1968
Todmorden Moor, Todmorden
Tonacliffe, Rossendale - shown as abandoned 1908
Tonacliffe Level, Rossendale - shown as abandoned 1908
Tong End Pasture, Facit
Town Bent, Oswaldtwistle
Town House, Great Marsden
Towneley Demesne, Towneley
Towneley Drift, Towneley
Towneley Boggart, Towneley
Towneley Park, Towneley
Union and Hole House, Cliviger
Wallnook, Wardle
Waterside, Eccleshill
Welch Whittle, Welch Wittle
Welch Whitle Day Eye, Welch Whittle
Weld Bank, Chorley
Whinney Fan, Altham
Whinney Hill, Altham
Whitebirk, Blackburn
Whitefield, Wardle
Whitewell Bottoms, Newchurch
Withwell, Chorley
Wholaw Nook, Wholaw
Woodnook, Accrington
Yarrow, Duxbury

Oldham area

Alkrington, Middleton
Bank House, Crompton, Oldham
Bardsley, Bardsley
Barrowshaw, Oldham
Bent Grange, Oldham
Besom Hill, Oldham
Brown Hill Fire Clay, Oldham
Browns, Crompton
Brushes Clough, Shaw
Chadderton,  Chadderton
Chamber, Oldham
Count Hill, Oldham
Crowl Knoll, Crompton
Denton Lane, Chadderton
Doghill, Crompton
Edge Lane, Oldham
Fairbottom, Bardsley
Ferney Field, Chadderton
Glodwick, Oldham
Greenacres, Oldham
Hanging Chadder, Thornham
Hathershaw, Thornham
Hartford, Oldham
Helmclough, Stacksteads
Hey, Oldham
Higginshaw Lane, Royton
Hodge Clough, Oldham
Holebottom, Oldham
Holebottom, Crompton
Honeywell Lane, Oldham
Hopwood, Hopwood
Hunt Clough, Chadderton
Jubilee, Crompton
Knott Lane, Bardsley
Low Crompton, Crompton
Low Side, Glodwick
Lower Moor, Oldham
New Earth, Lees
Oak, Oldham
Park, Crompton
Paulden Wood, Oldham
Rhodes Bank, Oldham
Robin Hill, Oldham
Roundthorn, Oldham
Royton, Royton
Sholver Fold, Oldham
Sholver Lane, Moorside
Sholver Moor, Oldham
Stockfield, Chadderton
Sunfield, Moorside
Tonge Lane, Middleton
Woodpark, Bardsley
Woodside, Chadderton

Rochdale area
Ab Top, Whitworth - shown as abandoned 1908
Alder Bank, Wardle
Ashworth, Ashworth
Bagslate, Bagslate
Bamford Closes, Norden
Bench Carr Fireclay, Wardle
Birchen Lee, Butterworth
Birtle Dean, Ashworth
Bower, Hollinwood Should be listed under Oldham
Broadhalgh, Rochdale
Brearley, Butterworth
Brotherod, Catley Lane
Brownhill, Catley Lane
Brownhouse, Healey,
Butterworth Hall, Milnrow
Calf Clough, Wardle
Captain Fold, Heywood
Cartridge Nook, Whitworth
Chadwick Hall, Chadwick
Chamber, Hollinwood Should be listed under Oldham
Close Barn No 2, Ashworth
Clapgate, Woodhouse Lane, Rochdale
Cleggswood, Butterworth
Croft Head, Butterworth
Crook Bank, Wardle
Doldrum, Rowley Moor
Drybank, Whitworth
Ealees, Littleborough
Greenland, Rowley Moor
Haugh Hey, Rochdale
Healey Hall, Healey
Hey Barn, Wardle
Hey Clough, Wardle
Higher Shore, Littleborough
Hill, Park Bridge Should be listed under Oldham
Hill Top, Littleborough - Closed 1966
Hodge Hill, Whitworth
Hollingworth, Hollingworth
Hugh Mill, Ashworth
Knowl, Wolstenholme
Knowsley, Whitworth
Land, Whitworth
Lanefoot, Littleborough
Lidgate, Littleborough
Lightowlers, Littleborough
Low Crompton, Rochdale Should be listed under Oldham
Lower Elpit Edge, Rochdale
Meadow Croft, Chadwick
Middlewood, Wardle Rochdale
Milnrow, Milnrow
Moleside, Milnrow
New Whitaker, Butterworth
Outwood, Rochdale
Pikehouse, Littleborough
Rake, Littleborough
Roads, Wardle
Rocher, Park Bridge Should be listed under Oldham
Rook View, Whitworth
Rough Bank, New Hay - shown as discontinued 1908
Schofield Hall, Butterworth - shown disused 1908
Shackleton, Shawforth
Shaw Bank, Butterworth
Shaw Field, Catley Lane
Shaw Moss, Butterworth
Sheepbank, Littleborough
Shore Lane, Butterworth
Skye, Littleborough
Sladen Mill, Littleborough
Smallbridge, Wardle
Starring,*Littleborough
Stopes, Littleborough
Toadleach, Healey
Tongue End Pasture, Rochdale
Tunshill,*Tunshill
Tunshill Hey, Littleborough
Turf House, Littleborough
Turf Pits, Oldham
Turf Tavern, Bagslate
Tweedale, Rochdale
Wallnook, Wardle
Whitaker Wood, Butterworth
Wicken Hall, New Hay
Wolstenholme Fold, Wolstenholme
Woodhouse Lane, Woodhouse Lane

St Helens area

Alexandra, Eccleston, St Helens
Almond, Skelmersdale
Ashton's Green Nos 2, 3 and 5, Parr, St Helens
Avenue, Rainford
Belle View, Skelmersdale
Berry Street, Skelmersdale
Bickerstaffe, Bickerstaffe
Black Moss, Skelmersdale
Blaguegate, Skelmersdale
Bold Nos 1, 2 and 3, Sutton, St Helens 
Broad Oak, Parr, St.Helens
Carrs, Prescot
Chapel House Nos 3 and 4, Skelmersdale
Clay Works, Rainford
Clock Face, Sutton, St Helens
Collins Green Nos 1 and 2, Burtonwood.
Coronation, Rainford
Cowley Hill, Windle, St Helens
Crank Hill, Prescott
Crawford, Skelmersdale
Cronton, Whiston
Cronton No 2, Whiston
Crop and Deep, St Helens
Cropper's Hill, Eccleston, St.Helens
Crow Orchard, Skelmersdale
Dalton, Dalton
Deep Pits, Rainford
Digmoor, Skelmersdale
Ditton Brook, Skelmersdale
Downall Green, Ashton in Makerfield.
Eccleston Hall, St Helens
Edge Green, Ashton in Makerfield.
Elton Head Colliery, Lowfield Lane, St Helens
Far Moss, Skelmersdale
Ferry Knoll, Skelmersdale
Frodsham, St Helens
Garswood Park, Ashton in Makerfield
Gerard's Bridge, Windle
Gillers Green, St Helens
Gillibrand, Parbold
Gin Lane, Eccleston
Glade Hill, Parr
Glenburn, Skelmersdale (Formerly Tawd Vale)
Gorsey Bank, Bickerstaffe
Green Gate, St Helens
Halsnead, Prescott
Havannah, Parr, St Helens
Heath Charnock, Heath Charnock
Hill Fold, Skelmersdale
Hilton, Skelmersdale
Holland, Upholland
Huyton, Huyton
Laffak, Parr, St Helens
Lathom, Lathom
Lathom Park, Lathom
Lawns Delph, Skelmersdale
Lea Green, St Helens
Lea Green (New Pits), St Helens
Legh Pit, Haydock (also known as Lee)
Lyme Nos 1 and 2, Haydock
Mill Lane, Rainford
Moss, Skelmersdale
Mossfield, Skelmersdale
Moss Side, Skelmersdale
New Boston, Haydock
Newburgh, Newburgh
Newton, Haydock
Nutgrove, Thatto Heath
Old Boston, Haydock
Old Engine, Skelmersdale
Parbold, Parbold
Park, Skelmersdale
Paradise, Prescott (properly known as Whiston No 1)
Parkside, Newton-le-Willows, closed 1993
Parr Stocks, Parr
Pear Tree, Skelmersdale
Peasley Cross, St Helens
Pewfall Colliery, Pewfall, Ashton in Makerfield.
Phoenix, St Helens
Prescot, Prescot
Prescot Brook, Huyton
Primrose, Rainford
Queen Pit, Haydock
Railway, Charnock
Rainford Delph, St Helens
Ram Pit, Haydock
Ravenhead, Sutton
Red Gate, Parr, St Helens
Rishton, Rishton
Royal, Eccleston
Sankey Brook, Parr, St Helens
School Lane, Skelmersdale
Sherdley, St Helens
Skelmersdale, Skelmersdale
Stanley, St Helens
Strawberry, Skelmersdale
School Lane, Skelmersdale
Sutton, Sutton
Sutton Manor, Sutton, St Helens
Sutton Heath Nos 2 and 3, St Helens
Swifts Fold, Skelmersdale
Tawd Vale No 7, Skelmersdale - listed as discontinued
Tawd Vale Nos 11 and 12, Skelmersdale
Thatto Heath, Thatto Heath
Union, Eccleston
Upholland, Upholland
Victoria, Rainford
Whimsey, Skelmersdale
Whinney, Skelmersdale
Whiston Nos 1 and 2, Prescot (also known as Paradise)
Whitemoss, Skelmersdale
Whitemoss Primrose, Skelmersdale
Whitmoss No 2, Skelmersdale
Whitemoss Park, Skelmersdale
Whitemoss Nos 4 and 6, Skelmersdale
Windmill, Upholland
Wood Pit, Haydock
Woods Old Teapot Nos 3 and 4, St Helens

Wigan area

Aspull
Aspull Pumping, Aspull
Bradshaw Hall, Aspull
Bradshaw House, Aspull
California, Aspull
Kirkless, *Aspull,
Kirkless Hall, Aspull,
Kirkless, Aspull
Kirkless Nos 1 and 2, Aspull
Moor No 5, Aspull
Woodshaw, Aspull

Ashton in Makerfield
Arch Lane, Ashton in Makerfield Arch Lane Nos 2, 3 and 4
Ashton, Ashton-in-Makerfield
Bamfurlong No 1, No 3 & No 4, Ashton in Makerfield
Bryn Hall Nos 1, 2, 3, 4, & 5, Ashton-in-Makerfield - Nos 2 and 3 abandoned November 1945
Bryn Moss, Ashton in Makerfield
Crawford No 1 No 2, Ashton in Makerfield
Deep Pit No 1 & No 2, Ashton in Makerfield
Downall Green, Ashton in Makerfield
Garswood Hall Nos 1 and 2, Ashton in Makerfield
Garswood Hall Nos 4, 5, 6 and 7, Ashton in Makerfield
Garswood Hall No 9 - listed as abandoned
Gladen Hey Ashton in Makerfield
High Brooks, Ashton-in-Makerfield
Ince Park Lane, Ashton in Makerfield
Landgate, Ashton in Makerfield
Lathom, Ashton in Makerfield
Leyland Green Drift, Ashton-in-Makerfield
Long Lane Nos 1 and 2, (Crow Pit), Ashton in Makerfield
Mains Nos 1 and 2, Ashton in Makerfield
Middle Pits, Ashton in Makerfield
Moor Lane Drift, Ashton in Makerfield
Park Lane, Ashton in Makerfield
Park New Drift, Ashton in Makerfield
Pewfall, Ashton-in-Makerfield
Quaker House, Ashton-in-Makerfield
Riding Lane, Ashton-in-Makerfield
Senely Green, Ashton in Makerfield 
The Park Nos 1 & 2, Ashton in Makerfield
Wain, Ashton in Makerfield

Billinge
Bank, Billinge
Birchley, Billinge
Bispham Hall, Billinge
Billinge Lane, Billinge
Gauntley No 1, Billinge
Mountains, Billinge
Otter Swift Nook, Billinge
Stanley, Billinge
Tarbuck Farm, Billinge
Walm, Billinge

Coppull
Birkacre Nos 1 and 2, Coppull
Blainscough 5 Feet, Coppull
Blainscough King, Coppull
Burgh, Coppull
Chisnall Hall Colliery Nos 1 and 2, Coppull
Coppull, Coppull
Ellerbeck Colliery Coppull
Hic-bibi, Coppull
Wood Pits Nos 1 and 2, Coppull

Haigh
Alexandra, Haigh
Aqueduct, Haigh
Bawkhouse, Haigh
Bridge, Haigh
Britannia, Haigh
Godfrey, Haigh – listed as not working in 1880
Gorses, Haigh
Gullet, Haigh – listed as not working in 1880
Haigh, Haigh,
Lindsay Nos 1 and 2, Haigh Lindsay No 3,
Meadow, Haigh
Morris Lane, Haigh – listed as not working in 1880
Tuckers Hill, Haigh – listed as not working in 1880
Wash, Haigh – listed as not working in 1880
William, Haigh

Hindley, Abram and Platt Bridge
Albion, Hindley Green
Grange Hall, Hindley
Hindley Field, Hindley
Hindley Green Six Feet, Hindley
Hindley Hall, Hindley
Long Lane Four Feet, Long Lane Three Feet, Hindley Green
Plank Lane, Hindley Green
Swan Lane, Hindley

Abram, Abram
Maypole Nos 1 and 2, Abram
Smith's Lane, Abram
Wigan Junction, Abram Nos 3 & 4

Fir Tree House, Platt Bridge
Foggs Fold, Platt Bridge
Low Hall Nos  5& 6, Platt Bridge

Ince in Makerfield
Amberswood, Ince-in-Makerfield
Birkett Bank, Ince in Makerfield
Hosier House, Ince-in-Makerfield
Ince, Ince-in-Makerfield
Ince Hall Nos 1 & 2, Ince-in-Makerfield
Ince Moss, Ince in Makerfield
Little Westwood, Ince-in-Makerfield
Moss Nos 1, 2, 3, 4, 5 & 6 Ince in Makerfield
Moss Hall, Ince-in-Makerfield
Platt Bridge, Ince-in-Makerfield
Rose Bridge, Ince in Makerfield
Spring, Ince-in-Makerfield
Trencherbone, Ince
West Cannel, Ince in Makerfield

Pemberton
Clap Gate, Pemberton
Hawkley, Pemberton
King Pit, Pemberton
Moss House, Pemberton
New Town, Pemberton
Norley Nos 2, 3, 4, and 5, Pemberton
Norley Hall, Pemberton
Pemberton, Pemberton (later renamed Pemberton Bye)
Pemberton King, Pemberton
Pemberton Prince, Pemberton
Pemberton Queen, Pemberton
Stonehouse, Pemberton
Waites Delf, Pemberton
Walthewhouse, Pemberton
Worsley Mesnes Nos 1 and 2, Pemberton
Worthington Hall Nos 1 and 2, Pemberton
Worsley Mesnes, Pemberton

Standish and Shevington
Almond Brook, Standish
Bradley, Standish
Broomfield, Standish
Four Lane Ends, Shevington, Wigan
Giants Hall Nos. 1, 2 and 3, Standish
Gidlow, Standish
John & Taylor Pits, Standish
Langtree, Standish
Martins Farm, Appley Bridge
Prospect, Standish
Robin Hill, Standish
Shevington, Shevington 
Standish Lower Ground, Standish
Swire, Standish
Taylor, Standish
Tunnel, Standish – listed as not working in 1880
Victoria, Standish Victoria No2 3 and 4
Wrightington, Wrightington

Uphollhand and Orrell
Albert, Upholland
Crawford Day Eye, Upholland
Ditton Brook, Upholland
Harts Lane Fireclay, Upholland - abandoned August 1945
Holland Nos 6 and 9, Upholland
King Edward, Upholland
Lafford Lane, Upholland
Lawn's Delf, Upholland
New Gate, Upholland
Orrell Hall, Orrell
Orrell Post, Orrell
Springfield, Orrell
Tower Hill, Upholland
Upholland, Upholland – listed as not working in 1880
Windmill Dalton, Upholland

Wigan
Alliance, Wigan
Arley, Wigan
Arley Yard, Wigan
Barley Brook, Wigan
Birchen Heads, Wigan
Blaguegate, Wigan
Bottling Wood, Wigan
Bye Pit, Wigan
Dean House, Wigan
Douglas Bank North, Wigan
Douglas Bank South, Wigan
Dove Lane, Wigan
Dukes, Wigan
East Cannel, Wigan
Edith and Mabel, Wigan
Elms, Wigan
Engine, Wigan
Gidlow and Swinley, Wigan
Grammar, Wigan
Hussey House, Wigan
Industrious Bee, Wigan
Meadow's House, Wigan
Mesnes, Wigan
Piltoft, Wigan
Platt Lane, Wigan
Saw Mills, Wigan
Seven Feet, Wigan
Sovereign Mill, Wigan
Trafford, Wigan
Whelley, Wigan

Winstanley
Arbour, Winstanley
Belle View, Dalton
Holme House, Winstanley
Summersales, Winstanley (formerly Sumners Hall Drift)
Venture, Winstanley
Windy Arbour, Winstanley
Winstanley, Winstanley

West Lancashire

 Lathom, Lathom
 Lathom Park, Lathom

References

External links
 Online copies of the mine reports and lists

 
 
 
Collieries Since 1854